Lexington, Kentucky, held an election for mayor on May 22, 2018 and November 6, 2018. It saw the election of Linda Gorton.

Results

First round

Runoff results

References 

Lexington, Kentucky
Mayoral elections in Lexington, Kentucky
Lexington, Kentucky